Edward Kocząb (2 August 1928 — 17 September 2002), was a Polish ice hockey player. He played for Legia Warsaw and KTH Krynica during his career. He also played for the Polish national team at the 1956 Winter Olympics and several World Championships.

References

External links
 

1928 births
2002 deaths
Ice hockey players at the 1956 Winter Olympics
KTH Krynica players
Legia Warsaw (ice hockey) players
Olympic ice hockey players of Poland
People from Krynica-Zdrój
Sportspeople from Lesser Poland Voivodeship
Polish ice hockey goaltenders